Astana, the capital city of Kazakhstan, is home to 118 completed high-rises, 11 of which stand at least  tall. The tallest building in Astana is the 54-story Emerald Towers, which rises  and was completed in 2012. It also stands as the first tallest in Kazakhstan.

Tallest buildings

This includes spires and architectural details but does not include antenna masts. The "Year" column indicates the year in which a building was completed.

Tallest under construction, approved and proposed

Under construction

This lists buildings that are under construction in Astana and are planned to rise at least . Under construction buildings that have already been topped out are also included.

References

Further reading

External links
Diagram of Astana skyscrapers on SkyscraperPage

 
Nur-Sultan